DomStufen-Festspiele is a theatre festival in Erfurt, Germany.

Theatre festivals in Germany